The 2020–21 FC Slovan Liberec season was the club's 63rd season in existence and its 28th consecutive season in the top flight of Czech football. In addition to the domestic league, Slovan Liberec participated in this season's editions of the Czech Cup and also participated in the UEFA Europa League. The season covered the period from 1 July 2020 to 30 June 2021.

Players

First-team squad

Out on loan

Pre-season and friendlies

Competitions

Overview

Czech First League

League table

Results summary

Results by round

Matches

Czech Cup

UEFA Europa League

Group stage

References

External links

FC Slovan Liberec seasons
Liberec
Liberec